Rondel (from Old French, the diminutive of roont "round", meaning "small circle") may refer to:

 Rondel (dagger) or roundel, type of medieval dagger
 Rondel (armour), a circular piece of steel, as part of an armour harness, that normally protects a vulnerable point
 Rondel (gaming)
 Rondel (poem), short poem of 14 lines
 Rondel enclosure, type of prehistoric enclosure found in continental Europe
 Rondel Racing, a British racing team that competed in the Formula 2 series between 1971 and 1973
 Rondel, a song by the English composer Edward Elgar
 The Rondels, an American instrumental group consisting of Ray Pizzi, James Petze, Lennie Petze, and Lenny Collins
 Bill Deal and the Rhondels, a band formed in 1959 in Portsmouth, Virginia, crossing blue-eyed soul and beach music.

See also
Roundel, a distinctive round logo on military (airforce or navy) craft
Roundel (poem), a poetic form devised by A. C. Swinburne
Rondeau (disambiguation)
Rondell (disambiguation)
Roundel (disambiguation)